The Bhoti spoken in Spiti valley, India, is a Tibetic language and is further classified as one of the Lahauli-Spiti languages.

References

Languages of India
Bodish languages
Endangered languages of India